Renato Fucini (1843–1921) was an Italian writer and poet.

External links
 
 

1843 births
1921 deaths
Italian poets
Italian male poets